Crazy Kutumba is a 2010 Kannada comedy film directed by B. Ramamurthy and produced by Ravi Joshi for Luv Kush Productions banner. The story is a remake of Marathi film De Dhakka (2008) which was inspired from the Hollywood film, Little Miss Sunshine (2006).

The film stars Ramesh Aravind and Ananth Nag with Sanathini, Dhanya Rao, Jai Jagadish, Bank Janardhan and other theater artistes from North Karnataka region playing supporting roles.

Cast 
 Ramesh Aravind as Shankar Patil
 Ananth Nag as Mallanna
 Sanathini as Sumathi
 Chindodi Veershankar
 M. S. Umesh
 Rajinikanth
 Jai Jagadish
 Karibasavaiah
 Bank Janardhan
 G. Bharathkumar
 Baby Dhanya Rao as Gowri
 Shanoor Sana

Plot
A family travels from a village to Bangalore, as one of its members is to participate in a dance contest. En route, the conflicts and travails of the family come to the fore in a humorous manner.

Soundtrack 

The music was composed by Ricky Kej for Junglee music company. One song "Amma Naanu" is composed by Mysore Ananthaswamy. The soundtrack includes popular folk poems written by acclaimed poets such as Kuvempu and K. S. Narasimhaswamy.

Reception

Critical response 

Shruti Indira Lakshminarayana of Rediff.com scored the film at 3 out of 5 stars and says "As the characters are from Belgaum, they speak Kannada in the North Karnataka style that too very convincingly. Coming to humour, it is the scenes between Anath Nag and Ramesh that mostly invite laughter. The comedian in Rajinikanth (who plays kleptomaniac) impresses only at a few places. Also the film could have done without Sundari's character. A critic from The New Indian Express wrote "Veteran actor Anant Nag shines in the role of a drunkard father. Well-known comedians Umesh and Karibasavayya have played their parts with ease. The newcomers Sanathini, Natana Rajanikanth, who plays a kleptomaniac, Veera Shankar, Vijayakumar and child artist Dhanya really impress and surely can be groomed further for future roles". A critic from Deccan Herald wrote "Ramesh as the sixth-pass genius, husband, disgruntled son and doting father is good. His attempt at learning a different dialect is praiseworthy. Anant Nag, the grizzled, liquor guzzling patriarch caresses each word lovingly. Rajnikant and Vijaykumar provide most of the lighter moments in the film. Baby Nityashree’s innocent look blends in"  A critic from Bangalore Mirror wrote  "The dialect is from north Karnataka but it has been kept simple enough for comprehension. The comedy, except, for scenes involving Rajinikanth, is subdued. Thankfully Ricky Kej’s music is not loud and the songs blend with the film. Crazy Kutumba is a film parents would want to take their children to".

References 

2010 films
2010s Kannada-language films
Indian comedy-drama films
2010 comedy-drama films
Kannada remakes of Marathi films
Indian remakes of American films
Films directed by B. Ramamurthy